The Nigerian National Assembly delegation from Akwa Ibom comprises three Senators representing Akwa Ibom North-East, Akwa Ibom North-West, and Akwa Ibom South  and ten Representatives representing Ukanafun/Orukanam, Etinan, Itu/Ibiono Ibom, Eket, Ikot Ekpene/ Essien Udim/ Ubot Akara, Abak, Ikono/ Ini, Oron/Mbo/Okobo/UrueOffong Oruko/Udung-Uko, Ikot Abasi, Uyo/Uruan/Nsit Atai/Ibesikpo Asutan.

Fourth Republic

The 4th Parliament (1999 - 2003)

5th Parliament (2003 - 2007)

6th Parliament (2007 - 2011)

7th Parliament (2011 - 2015)

8th Parliament (2015 - 2019)

9th Parliament (2019 - )

References

Official Website - National Assembly House of Representatives (Akwa Ibom State)
 Senator List

Politics of Akwa Ibom State
National Assembly (Nigeria) delegations by state